Gong Baoren (born August 1971 in Qingyuan Manchu Autonomous County, Liaoning) is a retired Chinese para swimmer who competed in the Sydney 2000 paralympic men's 100 m breaststroke SB7 event, finishing 0.03 second behind the finalist. He was distinguished from the other competitors in that he had no arms.

References

1971 births
Paralympic swimmers of China
Living people
Chinese amputees
Swimmers from Liaoning
Medalists at the 1996 Summer Paralympics
Medalists at the 2000 Summer Paralympics
Medalists at the 2004 Summer Paralympics
Swimmers at the 1996 Summer Paralympics
Swimmers at the 2000 Summer Paralympics
Swimmers at the 2004 Summer Paralympics
Paralympic gold medalists for China
Paralympic silver medalists for China
Chinese male breaststroke swimmers
Chinese male freestyle swimmers
Medalists at the World Para Swimming Championships
Paralympic medalists in swimming
S6-classified Paralympic swimmers